Avondale is a historic home located at Westminster, Carroll County, Maryland.   It is a Georgian style, -story brick house, measuring approximately 45 feet long by  feet deep, built about 1796. The house has a two-story wing measuring approximately 49 feet long by 13 feet deep.  It features a Palladian window centered on the pavilion directly over the entrance door.

It was listed on the National Register of Historic Places in 1975.

An iron foundry was built in the community of Avondale in 1765 by Leigh Master, a settler from New Hall, Lancashire, England, who operated it using slave labor.

References

External links
, including photo in 2003, at Maryland Historical Trust

English-American culture in Maryland
Houses on the National Register of Historic Places in Maryland
Houses in Carroll County, Maryland
Houses completed in 1796
Georgian architecture in Maryland
Westminster, Maryland
National Register of Historic Places in Carroll County, Maryland
1796 establishments in Maryland